Trail of Tears State Park is a public recreation area covering  bordering the Mississippi River in Cape Girardeau County, Missouri. The state park stands as a memorial to those Cherokee Native Americans who died on the Cherokee Trail of Tears. The park's interpretive center features exhibits about the Trail of Tears as well as displays and specimens of local wildlife. An archaeological site in the park was added to the National Register of Historic Places in 1970.

Activities and amenities
Activities in the park include camping, picnicking, swimming, hiking, and horseback riding. Fishing is provided at  Lake Boutin and on the Mississippi River. A lookout offers a view of the river and Illinois on the opposite shore. The park has four trails: Peewah  - ; Lake – ; Sheppard Point – ; and Nature – .

See also

Cherokee Nation (19th century)

References

External links
Trail of Tears State Park Missouri Department of Natural Resources
Trail of Tears State Park Map Missouri Department of Natural Resources

National Register of Historic Places in Cape Girardeau County, Missouri
Archaeological sites on the National Register of Historic Places in Missouri
Protected areas of Cape Girardeau County, Missouri
History of the Cherokee
Cherokee Nation (1794–1907)
State parks of Missouri
Monuments and memorials in Missouri
Protected areas on the Mississippi River
Protected areas established in 1957
Trail of Tears